Hugo Anglada Gutiérrez (born 17 March 2004) is a Spanish footballer who plays for SD Huesca as a central defender.

Club career
Born in Almudévar, Huesca, Aragon, Anglada represented UD Amistad, Real Zaragoza and SD Huesca as a youth. He made his senior debut with the latter's reserves on 23 May 2021, starting in a 3–2 home win over CD Binéfar, for the Tercera División play-offs.

On 7 July 2021, Anglada renewed his contract until 2025. He made his first team debut on 12 August of the following year, starting in a 0–0 Segunda División away draw against Levante UD.

References

External links

2004 births
Living people
Sportspeople from the Province of Huesca
Spanish footballers
Footballers from Aragon
Association football defenders
Segunda División players
Segunda Federación players
Tercera División players
Tercera Federación players
SD Huesca B players
SD Huesca footballers
Spain youth international footballers